is a Japanese professional baseball pitcher for the Chunichi Dragons in Japan's Nippon Professional Baseball. He previously played for the Orix Buffaloes.

External links

NPB.com

1990 births
Living people
Baseball people from Hyōgo Prefecture
Japanese baseball players
Nippon Professional Baseball pitchers
Orix Buffaloes players
Chunichi Dragons players